Maizel is a surname. Notable people with the surname include:

Gregg Maizel, musician from band Vigil
Marcos Maizel, musician fom band Uchpa

See also

Maizels
Mayzel